European Business School London (EBS London) was a private Business School in Regent's Park in Central London. It was a constituent school of Regent's College London, which became Regent's University London in 2013.

EBS London offered courses in the field of International Business Management and had a strong focus on Banking and Finance, reflected by the fact that a third of its graduates pursued a career in that field. Besides its focus on teaching, the university had a long-standing commitment to research, offering MPhil and PhD degrees.

Around 900 students from over 85 nationalities made the School highly international. It also had as strong focus on languages, with 70% of its graduates being fluent in at least four languages.
EBS has a strong representation of all nations especially Russian, Spanish, Italian and French.

History 
Founded in 1979, European Business School was an international institution with campuses in London, Paris, Frankfurt (Oestrich-Winkel) and Milan which had a pioneering influence on the European model of education. In 1985, though still co-operating and exchanging students, the EBS schools became independent. Each school kept the EBS name but added the city name after. European Business School London (EBSL), EBS Universität für Wirtschaft und Recht and European Business School Paris are the remaining European Business Schools. EBS London was part of the business faculty of Regent's College London until it became Regent's University London in 2013.

Programmes 
Core of the undergraduate programme was the BA (hons) degrees in International Business. Further undergraduate courses at the business faculty included a BA (hons) in International Events Management.

Master's level courses were available in the fields of general management, banking and finance, entrepreneurship and marketing, including a full-time MBA in International Business.

MBA Programme 
The MBA in International Business was a 12-month full-time programme. The EBS London MBA has been validated by the EQUIS and AACSB accredited Open University as associated organisation.

A compulsory study period abroad is an element of the course. EBS London MBA students can choose from the following partner universities:

 Copenhagen Business School, Copenhagen, Denmark
 Lubin School of Business, New York, United States of America
 Concordia University, Canada
 City University of Hong Kong, Hong Kong, China

Research 
Research active faculty members were involved in the Regent's Centre for Transnational Studies (RCTS), the Centre for Banking and Finance (CBF), and the Institute of Contemporary European Studies (iCES), which organised the prestigious Jean Monnet and 'Europe in the World' lectures.

Partner institutions 
EBS London had around 70 partner universities all over the world, notable institutions include the Université Paris-Dauphine and EDHEC in France, Solvay Brussels School of Economics and Management in Belgium, Copenhagen Business School in Denmark, Université Laval and John Molson School of Business in Canada, City University in Hong Kong, Pace University in the United States of America and the Fundação Getúlio Vargas in Brazil.

Scholarships 
European Business School London offered one full scholarship and two-half scholarships per year.

Notable alumni
 Zoë Tryon (born 1974), British "eco-aristocrat"
 Lapo Elkann (born 1977), American-Italian businessman and Agnelli-heir
 Kathrine Fredriksen (born 1983), Norwegian businesswoman
 Lady Kitty Spencer (born 1990), English model
 Sultan Muhammad V (born 1969),Sultan State of Kelantan

References

External links 
 Undergraduate programmes
 Postgraduate programmes

Education in the City of Westminster
Regent's University London
Business schools in England
Educational institutions established in 1979
1979 establishments in England